Pod obojím (Under Either) is the third studio album by Slovak  vocalist Szidi Tobias released on Studio DVA in 2008.

Track listing

Credits and personnel

 Szidi Tobias - lead vocal
 Richard Müller - lead vocal
 Marián Geišberg - lead vocal
 František Segrado - lead vocal
 Milan Vyskočáni - music, back vocal
 Peter Lipovský - lyrics
 Michal Hrubý - producer

 Kristína Mikitová - back vocal
 Silvia Vitteková - back vocal
 Mária Straková - back vocal
 KAMOTO - recording studio
 Studio LUX - mixing, mastering
 Lucie Robinson - photography
 Jozef Dobrík - design

Charts and sales

Weekly charts

Sales certifications

References

General
 
 
Specific

External links 
 SzidiTobias.cz > Discography > Pod obojím

2008 albums
Szidi Tobias albums